Yasmin Belo-Osagie is co-founder of She Leads Africa, which she co-founded with Afua Osei. She is the daughter of Nigerian billionaire Hakeem Belo-Osagie and lawyer Myma Belo-Osagie.

Early life and education 
Belo-Osagie was born in Boston, Massachusetts but grew up in Nigeria. She was a border in England before proceeding to Princeton where she graduated cum laude in History (major) and Finance (minor) in 2011. She attended Le Cordon Bleu (a hospitality education institution), in Paris and London.

She studied at Harvard Law School and at Stanford Graduate School of Business, graduating with a JD/MBA in 2019.

Career 
After she graduated from Princeton, Belo-Osagie worked with McKinsey & Company as a business analyst till 2013. While at McKinsey & Company, she met Afua Osei with whom she co-founded She Leads Africa.She also had a short working career at the Mandarin Oriental in Hong Kong after her culinary education in Le Cordon Bleu.

Personal life 
She is the daughter of Hakeem Belo-Osagie and Myma Belo-Osagie

Awards and recognition 
In 2017, Belo-Osagie was listed among the Quartz Africa Innovators. She was also listed on the Religious and Humanitarian category of the 2017 Most Influential People of African Descent.
She was listed among The 20 Youngest Power Women In Africa by Forbes in 2014.

In December 2016, She Leads Africa was invited to ring the closing bell at the New York Stock Exchange as the first African start-up to do so and Belo-Osagie rang the closing bell to join other Africans like Nelson Mandela, Kofi Annan and Nkosazana Zuma as those to have rung the closing bell of the NYSE.

References

External links 
She Leads Africa

Living people
Princeton University alumni
Nigerian women in business
Nigerian social entrepreneurs
Nigerian expatriates in the United Kingdom
People from Edo State
1990 births
Alumni of Le Cordon Bleu
American businesspeople
American emigrants to Nigeria
Stanford University alumni
Harvard Law School alumni